Smack Smash is the fourth album from German band, Beatsteaks. It was released in March, 2004 on Epitaph Records as was previous album, Living Targets, in 2002. It aided the band's breakthrough into the mainstream and was simultaneously released on WEA. The first two singles, "Hand in Hand" and "I Don't Care as Long as You Sing" became major hits on German MTV and the album nearly broke into the German top ten. The increased exposure allowed the band to play concerts in other European countries. It shipped 100,000 copies in Germany, going gold only for the album to go platinum in 2008 for shipping 200,000 copies in total since its release.

Track listing
"Big Attack" – 2:24
"Vision" – 2:49
"Ain't Complaining" – 2:48
"Hello Joe" – 3:29
"Hand In Hand" – 2:41
"Monster" – 2:02
"Everything" – 3:09
"I Don't Care As Long As You Sing" – 3:35
"Atomic Love" – 2:33
"Loyal To None" – 1:28
"What's Coming Over You" – 3:15
"My Revelation" – 1:45

Credits
Arnim Teutoburg-Weiß	–	vocals, guitar
Peter Baumann	–	guitar
Bernd Kurtzke	–	guitar
Torsten Scholz	–	bass
Thomas Götz	–	drums
Recorded in Berlin, Germany
Produced by Moses Schneider
Mixed by Peter Schmidt

Charts

Weekly charts

Year-end charts

References

External links
Beatsteaks official website
Epitaph Records album page

2004 albums
Beatsteaks albums
Epitaph Records albums